Nelamangala is a town in India. Its headquarters is  taluk, which is  located in the Bangalore Rural district of Karnataka state in India. Nelamangala is situated near the junction point of two National Highways, NH-75(48) (Bangalore - Mangalore) and NH-4 (Mumbai - Chennai to north of Bangalore city.

Geography 
Nelamangala Taluk is spread over 507 km2 .

Demography 
According to the 2011 census, Nelamangala has population of 37,232 of which 18,840 are males while 18,392 are females. The literacy rate in Nelamangala is 89.65%. In Nelamangala, male literacy is around 93.27% while female literacy rate is 85.97%.

Work Profile 
Out of the total population, 14,600 are somewhere engaged in some sort of work or business activity. Of this 11,118 are males while 3,482 are females. In the census survey, workers over there are defined as someone who does business, job, service, and engaged in labour activities. Out of the total 14,600 working population, 91.54% are engaged in Main Work while 8.46% of total workers are engaged in Marginal Work.

Places of interest around Nelamangala
Nelamangala is located on NH-4, around 27 km away from Bangalore city towards Tumkur and Mumbai. In 2020 the first Roll On Roll Off service of south western railway was started from the town of Nelamangala to  Bale in Maharashtra.It was recognised as the only privately operated RORO service on Indian Railways then.

See also
Bhairanayakanahalli

References

Cities and towns in Bangalore Rural district